Petra Füzi-Tóvizi (born 15 March 1999) is a Hungarian handballer for Debreceni VSC and the Hungarian national team.

She debuted in the national team on 22 November 2018 against Norway.

Achievements 
IHF Women's Junior World Championship:
: 2018

Personal life
She is a double major in physical education and history at the University of Debrecen. Her husband is Dániel Füzi handball player.

References

External links

1999 births
Living people
People from Nyíregyháza
Hungarian female handball players
Sportspeople from Szabolcs-Szatmár-Bereg County